Events in the year 2023 in Dominica.

Incumbents 

 President: Charles Savarin
 Prime Minister: Roosevelt Skerrit

Events 
Ongoing — COVID-19 pandemic in Dominica

Deaths 

 26 January – Irvine Shillingford, cricketer (born 1944).

References 

 
2020s in Dominica
Years of the 21st century in Dominica
Dominica
Dominica